STS-54 was a NASA Space Transportation System (Space Shuttle) mission using Space Shuttle Endeavour. This was the third flight for Endeavour, and was launched on January 13, 1993 with Endeavour returning to the Kennedy Space Center on January 19, 1993.

Crew

Mission highlights 

The primary payload was the fifth TDRS satellite, TDRS-F, which was deployed on day one of the mission. It was later successfully transferred to its proper orbit by the Inertial Upper Stage (IUS). Also carried into orbit in the payload bay was a Hitchhiker experiment called the Diffuse X-ray Spectrometer (DXS). This instrument collected data on X-ray radiation from diffuse sources in deep space.

Other middeck payloads to test the effects of microgravity included the Commercial General Bioprocessing Apparatus (CGPA) for-life sciences research; the Chromosome and Plant Cell Division in Space Experiment (CHROMEX) to-study plant growth; the Physiological and Anatomical Rodent Experiment (PARE) to examine the skeletal system and the adaptation of bone to space flight; the Space Acceleration Measurement Equipment (SAMS) to measure and record the microgravity acceleration environment of middeck experiments; and the Solid Surface Combustion Experiment (SSCE) to measure the rate of flame spread and temperature of burning filter paper.

Also, on day five, mission specialists Mario Runco Jr. and Gregory J. Harbaugh spent nearly 5 hours in the open cargo bay performing a series of space-walking tasks designed to increase NASA's knowledge of working in space. They tested their abilities to move about freely in the cargo bay, climb into foot restraints without using their hands and simulated carrying large objects in the microgravity environment. The EVA completed after 4 hours, 28 minutes.

The EVA was a late addition to the mission plan as part of NASA's objectives to hone EVA skills required for hardware assembly anticipating the International Space Station.

The mission completed on January 19, 1993 with a landing at Kennedy Space Center.

See also 

 List of human spaceflights
 List of Space Shuttle missions
 Outline of space science
 Space Shuttle

References

External links 
 NASA mission summary 

Space Shuttle missions
Spacecraft launched in 1993